Imran is a given name and a surname.

Imran may refer to:
 Al Imran, the third chapter (surah) of the Quran
 Imran (father of Mary)
 Imran (father of Maryam)
 Imran series, a series of Urdu spy novels written by Pakistani author Ibn-e-Safi
 Imran Series (Mazhar Kaleem), a series of Urdu spy novels written by Pakistani author Mazhar Kaleem

See also
 Imrani (1454–1536), Judæo-Persian poet